Fair Oaks is a town in Rogers and Wagoner counties in the U.S. state of Oklahoma. The population was 103 at the 2010 census, a 15.6 percent decline from the figure of 122 recorded in 2000. It is a suburb of Tulsa.

History
Fair Oaks was incorporated in 1966, by L. S. Robson, owner of a large ranch in Wagoner County. At the time, it contained two hundred acres of land and twenty residents. In 1969, the town added 15,000 acres. By 1980, the town was recognized as a "bedroom community" of Tulsa, and the population had grown to 324. The population peaked at 1,133 in 1990, and the Robson descendants agreed for the town and the remainder of the Robson ranch to be annexed by Tulsa.

Geography
Fair Oaks is located at  (36.147943, -95.708332). According to the United States Census Bureau, the town has a total area of 17.4 square miles (45.0 km2), of which 17.3 square miles (44.9 km2) is land and 0.04 square mile (0.1 km2) (0.17%) is water.

Demographics

As of the census of 2000, there were 122 people, 53 households, and 31 families residing in the town. The population density was 7.0 people per square mile (2.7/km2). There were 60 housing units at an average density of 3.5 per square mile (1.3/km2). The racial makeup of the town was 81.97% White, 13.93% Native American, and 4.10% from two or more races.

There were 53 households, out of which 30.2% had children under the age of 18 living with them, 49.1% were married couples living together, 7.5% had a female householder with no husband present, and 41.5% were non-families. 37.7% of all households were made up of individuals, and 5.7% had someone living alone who was 65 years of age or older. The average household size was 2.30 and the average family size was 3.10.

In the town, the population was spread out, with 26.2% under the age of 18, 9.0% from 18 to 24, 28.7% from 25 to 44, 24.6% from 45 to 64, and 11.5% who were 65 years of age or older. The median age was 37 years. For every 100 females, there were 125.9 males. For every 100 females age 18 and over, there were 114.3 males.

The median income for a household in the town was $32,500, and the median income for a family was $41,875. Males had a median income of $33,750 versus $21,875 for females. The per capita income for the town was $16,307. There were 10.7% of families and 10.9% of the population living below the poverty line, including 21.4% of under eighteens and none of those over 64.

References

External links
 Encyclopedia of Oklahoma History and Culture - Fair Oaks

Towns in Rogers County, Oklahoma
Towns in Wagoner County, Oklahoma
Towns in Oklahoma